A List of Mexican films of the 1900s:

1900s
Mexican